Ruben Bolling (born c. 1963 in New Jersey) is a pseudonym for Ken Fisher, an American cartoonist, the author of Tom the Dancing Bug and Super-Fun-Pak Comix. His work started out apolitical, instead featuring absurdist humor, parodying comic strip conventions, or critiquing celebrity culture. He came to increasingly satirize conservative politics after the September 11 attacks and Iraq war in the early 2000s. This trend strengthened with the Donald Trump presidency and right-wing populism from 2017-2020, his critiques of which earned him several cartooning awards.

Career 
Fisher, who has no formal art training, read many comics when he was a child (his biggest influence being Garry Trudeau's Doonesbury), and sometimes features their styles in his work. However, he didn't aspire to be a full-time cartoonist; instead he studied economics as an undergraduate at Tufts University and later attended Harvard Law School (graduating in 1987). It was at Harvard in the mid-1980s that Fisher came up with the idea for "Tom the Dancing Bug" and his pseudonym, Ruben Bolling (which is a melding of the names of two favorite old-time baseball players, Ruben Amaro and Frank Bolling). Tom the Dancing Bug originally ran in the Harvard Law School Record.

After graduation, Fisher practiced law for several years before resigning to pursue comics full-time.  When that didn't work out, comic writing became a side interest and Fisher became a full-time employee at a financial services company. Tom the Dancing Bug was picked up for weekly syndication in 1997 by Universal Press Syndicate.

Fisher was working on building a full-time comics career, driven in part by a project, thus far never realized, with New Line Cinema to produce a movie about his character Harvey Richards, Esq., a "Lawyer for Children."

At its peak, Tom the Dancing Bug was syndicated in print in over 100 newspapers.  In 2012, Fisher launched a subscription service, the Inner Hive, which he credits with keeping the comic going amid declines in print newspapers.

A Super Fun-Pak Comix installment from 2014, entitled The Comic Strip That Has A Finale Every Day, parodied farewell installments from long-running comic strips. This then became an ongoing feature on the gocomics.com site under the pseudonym John "Scully" Scully, releasing the same comic every day.

In 2015, Fisher published the first in a series of children's books, The EMU Club Adventures.

Awards 

Fisher is a five-time winner of the Association of Alternative Newsweeklies Award for Best Cartoon, for 2002, 2003, 2007, 2008, and 2009. In 2010, he received the Society of Professional Journalists award for Editorial Cartooning for a non-daily publication.

Fisher won numerous awards for his satirical criticism of the Donald Trump presidency. He was the winner of the 2017 Herblock Prize for editorial cartooning based on a selection of 15 Trump-themed Tom the Dancing Bug cartoons. In 2017, he won a 2017 Silver Reuben Award from the National Cartoonists Society for "Donald and John," a series in the style of Calvin and Hobbes that cast Donald Trump as a childish Calvin-like figure and Trump alter-ego John Barron as Trump's "imaginary publicist" in place of Hobbes.

He was awarded a prize for best cartoon in the 2018 Robert F. Kennedy Book & Journalism Awards and in 2019 and 2021 he was a finalist in the Editorial Cartooning category for the Pulitzer Prize. His "mordant wit, superior artwork and inventive delivery" won him the 2021 Berryman Award for Editorial Cartoons from the National Press Foundation.

Personal life 
Fisher is married to a lawyer; they have three children.

Bibliography 
 1992: Tom the Dancing Bug 
 1997: All I Ever Needed to Know I Learned From My Golf-Playing Cats 
 2004: Thrilling Tom the Dancing Bug Stories (oversized treasury) (Andrews McMeel) 
 2015: Alien Invasion in My Backyard: An EMU Club Adventure (Andrews McMeel) 
 2015: Ghostly Thief of Time: An EMU Club Adventure (Andrews McMeel) 
 2020: Tom the Dancing Bug Presents: Into the Trumpverse (Clover Press) 
 2020: The Super-Fun-Pak Comix Reader (Clover Press) 
 2021: Tom the Dancing Bug Awakens (Clover Press) 
 2022: Tom the Dancing Bug: Without The Bad Ones (Clover Press) 
 2022: Tom the Dancing Bug: Eat the Poor (Clover Press)

References

External links 
 

Living people
Harvard Law School alumni
Tufts University alumni
Artists from New Jersey
1963 births
American cartoonists